Eslamabad-e Tang Sorkh (also Romanized as Eslāmābād-e Tang Sorkh; also known as Eslāmābād) is a village in Sarrud-e Jonubi Rural District, in the Central District of Boyer-Ahmad County, Kohgiluyeh and Boyer-Ahmad Province, Iran. At the 2006 census, its population was 47, in 9 families.

References 

Populated places in Boyer-Ahmad County